The Ibi, also known as the Yui or Ibihica, were a Timucua chiefdom in the present-day U.S. state of Georgia during the 16th and 17th centuries. They lived in southeastern Georgia, about 50 miles from the coast. Like their neighbors, the Icafui (or Cascange) tribe, they spoke a dialect of the Timucua language called Itafi.

The chief's main village was Ibihica, and he controlled four other villages in the area. The Ibi first encountered Spanish friars in 1597, and soon became integrated into the Spanish mission system. A mission, San Lorenzo de Ibihica, was founded after 1616. The town and mission appear to have been destroyed by the Spanish following the Timucua Rebellion of 1656, and the people relocated. Surviving Ibi may have merged with other Timucua groups or moved beyond the Spanish sphere of influence.

Name
The Ibi are also known as the Yui, though this appears to be a manuscript error: the letter u has been substituted for v, which is pronounced as, and often substituted for, b in contemporary Spanish. As such the correct spelling would be Yvi or Ybi, standardized to Ibi, a Timucuan word generally referring to water. Anthropologist John Worth prefers referring to them as the Ibihica, the name of their main village where their mission was located.

History
Little is known of the native population of southern Georgia in prehistory. Archaeological study of the region has been limited and the ceramic chronology is not well established, but the area as a whole appears to have been a "transitory zone" between the Savannah and St. Johns culture regions. The Ibi first enter the historical record during the Spanish mission era, at which time they were noted as living on the Georgia mainland 14 leagues (about 50 miles) from Mission San Pedro de Mocama, the mission to the Tacatacuru chiefdom on Cumberland Island. The Ibi numbered between 700 and 800 people living in five villages under one chief, whose main village was known as Ibihica. They spoke a dialect of the Timucua language known as Itafi or Icafui, which was also spoken by their neighbors, the Icafui (also known as the Cascangue) tribe. Farther west, perhaps on the east side of the Okefenokee Swamp, were another Timucua group, the Oconi.

The Ibi became involved in the Spanish mission system relatively early. They were visited by the Franciscan Fray Pedro Ruíz in 1597, and later that year their chief traveled to the Spanish colonial capital of St. Augustine to render obedience to the Spanish king. However, the 1597 revolt of the Guale tribe, who lived farther north on the Georgia coast, caused Ruíz to be recalled. Still, the Ibi and the neighboring Oconi were visited with some regularity by friars from the nearby missions of San Pedro de Mocama and San Juan del Puerto. These visits were evangelically successful, but affected the local population, as by 1603 the Spanish noted that some Ibi were "leaving their towns" and relocating to the coastal missions. After 1616 the Ibi were given their own mission, San Lorenzo de Ibihica, established in the main town. The town and mission continued to exist until 1656, the year of the Timucua Rebellion against the Spanish government. At this time both Ibihica and nearby Oconi village were apparently destroyed by the Spanish. Surviving Ibi appear to have merged into other communities or moved outside the sphere of the Spanish colonial government.

Notes

References

Native American tribes in Florida
Native American tribes in Georgia (U.S. state)
Spanish Florida
Pre-statehood history of Georgia (U.S. state)
Timucua
Extinct Native American peoples